Arlington Transit (ART) is a bus transit system that operates in Arlington County, Virginia, and is managed by the county government. The bus system provides service within Arlington County, and connects to Metrobus, nearby Metrorail stations, Virginia Railway Express, and other local bus systems. Most ART routes serve to connect county neighborhoods to local Metrorail stations, as well as the Shirlington Bus Station. It includes part of the Pike Ride service along Columbia Pike, which is shared with WMATA.

ART is operated by First Transit and currently operates 81 buses. ART provides a fixed-route bus service within Arlington County on sixteen routes and carries almost three million passengers annually. As part of the Arlington Initiative to Reduce Emission project (AIRE), the entire ART bus fleet runs on clean-burning Compressed Natural Gas in order to be environmentally friendly in Arlington County. ART's purpose is to supplement the regional rail and bus service provided by the Washington Metropolitan Area Transit Authority (WMATA), providing local bus service, and connecting to neighborhoods, businesses, and departments within Arlington County.

History 
Before ART's inception, WMATA was the only transit agency that served Arlington County, providing both bus and rail service. Some Metrobus routes served the neighborhoods of Arlington County, connecting them to the Metrorail system. In November 1998, the Arlington County board created the ART service, as part of their effort to improve transportation in the county. ART's first route served Crystal City, while other routes were still operated by Metrobus.

On September 7, 2003, a new service was started along Columbia Pike, known as Pike Ride. It was first operated by Metrobus and served by the 16 line, heading to Pentagon Station. On April 7, 2003, ART began providing Pike Ride routes by introducing ART Route 41. Route 41 started serving points west of South Glebe Road, including the neighborhood of Arlington Mill. Service was then increased with ART routes 74 and 75. Route 74 provided service to the eastern portion of the area, and the neighborhoods of Arlington Village and Arlington View. Route 75 served the neighborhood of Arlington Mill, along with Route 41. ART Route 73 was also part of the Pike Ride system, which served the eastern portion of Columbia Pike, along with Route 74, and the neighborhood of Arlington Heights. Route 73 was discontinued on September 30, 2005, due to low ridership.

In 2006, ART began increasing service, both by acquiring Metrobus routes and by bringing service to more neighborhoods. Metrobus Route 24P was the first route to be converted to ART, as Route 42. In 2009, route 42 was expanded to full week service, replacing the 24P. The GEORGE bus system was originally operated by Metrobus, until the City of Falls Church transferred operations to ART. This bus system served as a feeder to Metrorail stations at the east and west ends of the city. The GEORGE service was ultimately suspended in 2010 due to budget constraints.

In 2008, the Shirlington Bus Station, also known as the Shirlington Transit Center, opened in The Village at Shirlington. The Shirlington Transit Center is located at South Quincy Street near the intersection of South Randolph Street and 31st Street South. This bus station is also located near Shirley Highway (I-395). This bus station is accessible from Shirlington Circle, having buses heading to and from Pentagon and Pentagon City Stations. With the opening of the new bus station, ART and Metrobus began using it as major transfer point. Shirlington Station connects most bus routes to nearby Metrorail stations, as well as the neighborhood of Fairlington. Shirlington Station also provides access to the Village at Shirlington, as it provides local restaurants, arts and entertainments, Shirlington Branch Library, and stores. In addition to bus service, the Shirlington Transit Center houses the Arlington Commuter Store, where it sells WMATA SmarTrip cards and iRide SmarTrip cards. In 2014, the Alexandria Transit Company's DASH bus began serving this station with the AT9 route (now Line 36A/B), connecting it to the City of Alexandria between Mark Center and Potomac Yard.

The county has been converting its bus fleet to Compressed Natural Gas, to follow the Arlington County AIRE project, and to be environmentally friendly. ART began this project by starting with its order of NABI LFW buses in 2007. Older buses, as well as the GEORGE buses, ran on diesel fuel. Since the GEORGE bus system was suspended, the ART fleet run only on CNG fuel. From 2007, ART increased and improved on its bus routes to reduce crowding. In 2011, ART ordered the Designline EcoSaver CNG-Electric Hybrid buses. These buses are different than the other buses, as other agencies ordered Diesel-electric Hybrid buses, although the CNG-Electric Hybrid buses are expected to reduce emissions and noise pollutions in the county. In 2013, ART removed them from service due to brake failure issues. Since these buses didn't return in service because of reliability and safety reasons, ART returns to provide CNG fueled buses only.

On December 29, 2019, Arlington Transit announced that First Transit commenced a five-year contract to operate the network, ending its partnership with National Express Transit Corporation which had operated ART since 2009. ART's operator switch went into effect in order to improve service with the on-time performance.

In August 2022, ART began operating as shuttle buses for the Arlington County Fair, a summer annual event, within the fair and the Arlington Career Center and Washington-Liberty High School parking garage.

In September 2022, Arlington County began testing electric buses, as part of the plan to go carbon neutral by 2050. Arlington Transit is partnering with 3 to 4 bus manufacturers for the Zero Emissions Bus from Fall 2022 to Winter 2023.

Ridership 
ART carries over 10,000 passengers per weekday within Arlington County. Route 41, which runs through Columbia Pike, is ART's busiest route with about 2,000 rides per weekday, with the 15 minute peak period. In 2017, ART ordered 13 new 40' New Flyer Xcelsior CNG buses, which are different from its fleet, as NABI discontinued its LFW models in 2015. These buses went in service in September, 2018 on routes 41, 43, and 55 to provide reliable service, and reduce crowding.

Fares 

As of June 25, 2017, the ART fare structure is as follows:

 All bus routes are $2.00 for riders using cash or SmarTrip cards.
 Virginia Hospital Center employees and Arlington employees that carries a hospital ID rides routes 51 and 52 for free.
 Per paying adult, children under five years of age rides ART for free.
 Students, senior citizens and disabled patrons only pay $1.00.

Transfers and passes 
, ART no longer issues or accepts paper transfers.  Riders must use a SmarTrip card to get the rail-to-bus discount or to transfer free from bus to bus. Bus-to-bus free transfer time from ART to ART is within a two hours period. Bus-to-bus transfer between ART to/from Metrobus is also free. Transfers from ART to/from Metrorail receives a $0.50 discount. Starting September 3, 2013, students of Arlington Public Schools that attends middle, or high school may obtain an iRide SmarTrip Card that allows students of Arlington County to ride ART Buses for the discounted student rate of $1.00. On June 25, 2017, the iRide SmarTrip Card half-fare program extended to elementary school students, instead of having them paying a full fare.

SmarTrip Cards and iRide SmarTrip Cards can be purchased at the Arlington Commuter Stores, located at Shirlington Transit Center, Ballston-MU Station, Rosslyn Station, Crystal City Station, and Pentagon Station. Arlington Mobile Commuter Stores also sells SmarTrip and iRide SmarTrip cards within Arlington County, as well as Washington, D.C. and Alexandria Union Station. iRide SmarTrips are sold exclusively in Arlington Commuter Stores, while regular SmarTrips are also available in WMATA Metrorail stations.

Fleet 
ART's fleet is entirely compressed natural gas-fueled.

Retired fleet

Routes

Former routes 
These routes have been served by Arlington Transit at one point but have since been discontinued due to either low ridership, simplification to other routes, or combined into another route.

References

External links 
 
 Washington Commuter Page information on ART

1998 establishments in Virginia
Bus transportation in Virginia
Northern Virginia
Transit authorities with natural gas buses
Transportation in Arlington County, Virginia